The Golf Course Formation is a geologic formation in Oklahoma. It preserves fossils dating back to the Carboniferous period.

See also

 List of fossiliferous stratigraphic units in Oklahoma
 Paleontology in Oklahoma

References
 

Carboniferous geology of Oklahoma